Minuscule 174 (in the Gregory-Aland numbering of New Testament manuscripts), ε 109 (in the von Soden numbering of New Testament manuscripts), is a Greek minuscule manuscript of the New Testament Gospels, on parchment. It is dated by a colophon to the year 1052 CE.

Description 

The manuscript is a codex (the forerunner to the modern book), containing the text of the four Gospels on 132 thick parchment leaves (size ), with three gaps (Matthew 1:1-2:1; John 1:1-27; 8:47-21:25). The text is written in two columns per page, 30 lines per page (text-block size 18.2 cm by 6.5 cm), in brown-red ink, with the capital letters in red. It has marginalia.

The text is divided according to the chapters (known as  / kephalaia), whose numbers are given in the margin, and their titles ( / titloi) at the top of the pages. There is also a division according to the Ammonian Sections, with references to the Eusebian Canons written below Ammonian Section numbers (an early system of dividing the four Gospels into different sections).

It contains tables of contents (also known as  / kephalaia) before each Gospel, lectionary markings in the margin for liturgical use, and subscriptions at the end of each of Gospel. The subscriptions contain the numbers of phrases ( / rhemata) and numbers of lines ( / stichoi).

 Text 

The Greek text of the codex has been considered a representative of the Caesarean text-type. The text-types are groups of different New Testament manuscripts which share specific or generally related readings, which then differ from each other group, and thus the conflicting readings can separate out the groups. These are then used to determine the original text as published; there are three main groups with names: Alexandrian, Western, and Byzantine. The Caesarean text-type however (initially identified by biblical scholar Burnett Hillman Streeter) has been contested by several text-critics, such as Kurt and Barbara Aland. The manuscript is a member of textual Family 13, also known as the Ferrar Group/Family. Kurt Aland did not place it in any Category among his New Testament manuscript text classification system.

According to the Claremont Profile Method (a specific analysis method of textual data), it represents textual group Λ in Luke 1, Luke 10, and Luke 20.

 History 

The manuscript was written by the monk Constantine "tabernis habitante", "cum praessent praefecturae Georgilas dux Calabriae". The codex, together with 173, 175, 176, and 177, was brought from the Library of the Basilian monks.

It was examined by Bianchini, Birch (about 1782), Scholz, J. Rendel Harris, and Ferrar. C. R. Gregory saw it in 1886.

It is currently housed at the Vatican Library (Vat. gr. 2002), at Rome.

 See also 
 List of New Testament minuscules
 Minuscule 13
 Biblical manuscript
 Textual criticism

 References 

 Further reading 

 J. Rendel Harris, On the Origin of the Ferrar Group, (Cambridge, 1893).
 W. H. Ferrar, A Collation of Four Important Manuscripts of the Gospels, ed. T. K. Abbott, (Dublin:Macmillan, 1877). Internet Archive
 Soden, Hermann. Die Schriften des Neuen Testaments in ihrer ältesten erreichbaren Textgestalt hergestellt auf Grund ihrer Textgeschichte. Göttingen: Vandenhoeck & Ruprecht, 1913.
 Lake, Kirsopp & Silva. Family 13 (The Ferrar Group) The Text According to Mark, Studies and Documents 11, 1941.
 Geerlings, Jacob.  Family 13 – The Ferrar Group: The Text According to Matthew, Studies and Documents 19, 1961.
 Ibid for Luke, Studies and Documents 20, 1961.
 Ibid for John, Studies and Documents 21, 1962.

 External links 
 Minuscule 174 at the Encyclopedia of Textual Criticism''

Greek New Testament minuscules
11th-century biblical manuscripts
Manuscripts of the Vatican Library